The Demos are a collection of demos from the album Fear Fun by Father John Misty. The sound of the EP is sparse, noisy and minimalistic, producing the typical "demo sound". The track "Nothing Hurts Worse" is exclusive to this release. The EP was given away free with the mail preorders of the limited "Losers" LP edition. The "Losers" edition is pressed on pink marble vinyl and limited to 850 copies.

Track listing
 "Funtimes In Babylon" - 3:37
 "Nancy From Now On" - 3:48
 "Sally Hatchet" - 2:38
 "Nothing Hurts Worse" - 4:08
 "Everyman Needs A Companion" - 5:01

References

Josh Tillman albums
2010 EPs
Demo albums